The men's 4 × 100 metres relay event at the 2016 African Championships in Athletics was held on 24 June in Kings Park Stadium.

Results

Heats
Qualification: First 3 of each heat (Q) and the next 6 fastest (q) qualified for the semifinals.

Final

References

http://www.athleticskenya.or.ke/wp-content/uploads/2014/04/20th-CAA-Africa-Senior-Championshiops-Durban-Results-2016.pdf

2016 African Championships in Athletics
Relays at the African Championships in Athletics